In the study of Lorentzian manifold spacetimes there exists a hierarchy of causality conditions which are important in proving mathematical theorems about the global structure of such manifolds. These conditions were collected during the late 1970s.

The weaker the causality condition on a spacetime, the more unphysical the spacetime is. Spacetimes with closed timelike curves, for example, present severe interpretational difficulties. See the grandfather paradox.

It is reasonable to believe that any physical spacetime will satisfy the strongest causality condition: global hyperbolicity. For such spacetimes the equations in general relativity can be posed as an initial value problem on a Cauchy surface.

The hierarchy 

There is a hierarchy of causality conditions, each one of which is strictly stronger than the previous. This is sometimes called the causal ladder. The conditions, from weakest to strongest, are:

 Non-totally vicious
 Chronological
 Causal
 Distinguishing
 Strongly causal
 Stably causal
 Causally continuous
 Causally simple
 Globally hyperbolic

Given are the definitions of these causality conditions for a Lorentzian manifold . Where two or more are given they are equivalent.

Notation:
  denotes the chronological relation.
  denotes the causal relation.

Non-totally vicious 

 For some points  we have .

Chronological 

 There are no closed chronological (timelike) curves.
 The chronological relation is irreflexive:  for all .

Causal 

 There are no closed causal (non-spacelike) curves.
 If both  and  then

Distinguishing

Past-distinguishing 

 Two points  which share the same chronological past are the same point:
 
 For any neighborhood  of  there exists a neighborhood  such that no past-directed non-spacelike curve from  intersects  more than once.

Future-distinguishing 

 Two points  which share the same chronological future are the same point:
 
 For any neighborhood  of  there exists a neighborhood  such that no future-directed non-spacelike curve from  intersects  more than once.

Strongly causal 

 For any neighborhood  of  there exists a neighborhood  such that there exists no timelike curve that passes through  more than once.
 The Alexandrov topology agrees with the manifold topology.

Stably causal 

A manifold satisfying any of the weaker causality conditions defined above may fail to do so if the metric is given a small perturbation. A spacetime is stably causal if it cannot be made to contain closed causal curves by arbitrarily small perturbations of the metric. Stephen Hawking showed that this is equivalent to:

This is a scalar field  on  whose gradient  is everywhere timelike and future-directed. This global time function gives us a stable way to distinguish between future and past for each point of the spacetime (and so we have no causal violations).

Globally hyperbolic 

  is strongly causal and every set  (for points ) is compact.
This means that:

See also 
 Spacetime
 Lorentzian manifold
 Causal structure
 Globally hyperbolic manifold
 Closed timelike curve

References 

Lorentzian manifolds
Theory of relativity
General relativity
Theoretical physics